The Port Arthur Sea Hawks were a Gulf Coast League (1950–1953), Evangeline League (1940–1942, 1954) and Big State League (1955–1956) baseball team based in Port Arthur, Texas, United States. In 1953, they were affiliated with the Dallas Eagles, and in 1954 they were affiliated with the Tyler Tigers.

The Sea Hawks played in Seahawk stadium, a new baseball field that was built in 1950 that could seat up to 4,800 fans. The stadium was built in the hopes that professional baseball teams would continue playing in Port Arthur, but the stadium was only used for 8 years before it was torn down. 

They won one league championship in their history, in their final season - 1956, under managers Lloyd Gearhart and Al Barillari.  Among the players who played for them was Al Silvera.

References

Evangeline Baseball League teams
Baseball teams established in 1950
Defunct minor league baseball teams
Baseball teams disestablished in 1956
1950 establishments in Texas
1956 disestablishments in Texas
Evangeline Baseball League
Defunct Florida Complex League teams
Defunct Big State League teams
Defunct baseball teams in Texas
Port Arthur, Texas